There are three notable museums inside the Kangla Fort in Imphal West district of Kangleipak, which are the Kangla Museum, the Archaeological Museum and the Memento Museum. Some people also count the Hijagang (Boatyard of traditional Meitei watercrafts) as a museum.

Kangla Museum 
The Kangla Museum showcases the lifestyles of royalties, ancient artistic and cultural heritage and maps of Kangleipak.
In the year 2018, alongside the annual Sangai festival celebrations, the Kangla Museum was visited by Maha Chakri Sirindhorn, the princess of Thailand.

Archaeological Museum 

Inaugurated on the 20th of November 2017, by Nongthombam Biren Singh, the Chief Minister of Manipur, the Archaeological Museum inside the Kangla Fort in Imphal, houses replicas including that of the memorial stone of Maharaja Chandrakirti Singh at Ukhrul district, Churachandpur, Tipaimukh and areas of Imphal Valley. 
Besides, stone tools belonging to Stone Age found in the Tharon Cave and the Kangkhui Cave are also kept in the museum. Hardened pots and inscriptions are preserved. Various antique coins are also on display in the museum. 
Ancient artefacts collected from the excavations of Sekta, Khangabok and the Kangla itself are also on display.

Memento Museum 
On the 21st of November 2018, Nongthombam Biren Singh, the Chief Minister of Manipur, inaugurated the Memento Museum inside Kangla Fort before the beginning of the annual Sangai festival 2018. It was done before the arrival of Maha Chakri Sirindhorn, the princess of Thailand, for meeting Leishemba Sanajaoba, the titular King of Manipur, for gracing the annual Sangai festival and for visiting the Kangla Fort.

See also 
 Sekta Archaeological Living Museum
 Manipur State Museum
 Imphal Peace Museum
 INA War Museum
 Hijagang

Notes

References

External links 

Meitei architecture
Museums in Manipur